The Volgans are a fictional fascist Russian government appearing in 2000 AD in the Invasion!/Savage and the Ro-Busters/ABC Warriors by Pat Mills. The stories are set in different times: Savage in the present day (originally the near future of 1999), after the Volgan conquest of Europe, and ABC Warriors in 2080s when the Volgans fell to the United States of America.  (The two series began a crossover from Savage Book 5, with the original Mark 1 ABC Warrior robots deployed in 2009).

Invasion! was originally going to use the Soviet Union as the main villains but at the last minute, the comic was ordered to change them into a fictional villain to avoid antagonizing the Soviet Embassy in London, due to Britain and the Western world being engaged in détente with the Soviet Union during the mid/late 1970s. In the sequel series Savage the Volgans are shown to be the Soviet Union after a regime change due to a successful 1991 Soviet coup d'état.

Volgan history

The Volgan Republic of Asia was founded when an individual called Vashkov united the Volgograd citizens into a fascist party named after the local river in 1989. Leading the party to a military coup against Mikhail Gorbachev and the Soviet government in 1991, he declared himself the sole leader of the Soviet Union which was renamed the Volgan Republic.

After new reserves of North Sea oil were discovered near Britain, he sought the help of a fifth column to invade the country  and much of Western Europe along with it. A deal was made with the United States ensuring that it did not get involved with the Volgan activities.

The result was the Eight Hour War of 1999, so named because it took that long for the Volgans to conquer the United Kingdom. The Midlands were hit by nuclear weaponry, diehard politicians and generals were executed, and defiant British army units were massacred at Stonehenge. Many Britons were sent to concentration camps throughout the Volgan empire. The conquered states were renamed the Eurasian Economic Community and the Volgan occupational forces would be called "EEC peacekeepers" by 2004.

The invasion immediately led to a protracted occupation and an organised underground uprising by figures like the Free European Army, Traitor's Gate, former MI5 & military elements, and the notorious Bill Savage who assassinated Vashkov. Collaborators were nicknamed "Double Yellows" after the twin yellow stripe on the uniform of British State Security officers. Those suspected of terrorism were sent to "Camp Sunshine" in Siberia. Escapist literature such as bodice rippers, utopian prophecies, and space opera were mass-produced as a means of keeping the population pacified.

In 2004, a massive uprising led to the Volgans being pushed out of a large part of Britain. In 2006, however, there was a reoccupation under unknown circumstances, and by 2007 the Volgans (partially via a propaganda campaign) were becoming more accepted, and a Reconciliation Month was held as a goodwill gesture. At the same time, the United States fell out with the Volgans, and began both landing special forces in the Republic of Ireland and arming the British resistance.

To force Savage and the resistance to cease operations, the Volgans framed them for civilian massacres  and attempted to frame them for a rocket attack at St Paul's Cathedral during Reconciliation Day festivities in order to make America cease their support for this resistance. Bill Savage's intervention meant the rocket was accidentally fired at a spy blimp instead, and when the Volgans executed a hundred civilians in retaliation – a known response to any attack on the blimp – America instead moved further to open hostilities.

In 2009, the US Air Force had "e-bombed" – meaning electromagnetic pulse weapons – the occupied London, reducing technology to the level of 1984, and were using local guerillas to identify and bomb key targets in advance of an invasion. The Volgans ramped up fortications under the "Fortress Britannia" initiative, and tried to manipulate the Allied landings into taking place at Holyhead where defences were strongest. This failed, and the Americans deployed waves of robots in a beach landing as an advance guard. However, the robots could not distinguish enemy targets from friendlies, while the Volgans had developed teleportational technology; Volgan soldiers were able to teleport behind enemy lines and turn the robots on US soldiers, forcing the US to scale back its plans in the face of public outcry at home.

By 2010, the Volgans had developed their own war robots, who were also unable to recognise friendlies and were designed for extreme brutality, however the Allies still manage to liberate Britain that same year.

The Volgan War/Fourth Oil War

With the world's oil reserves finally running out, the United States started "The Volgan War" under the guise of liberation but with the sole intention of capturing much needed oil reserves (leading to its unofficial name of the Fourth Oil War).

As the war got bogged down, the Americans began replacing human soldiers with their ABC Warrior "War-Droids" on various battlefields in Europe and Russia, starting with the original Hammerstein. The Volgans began using more and more robots themselves, ending up with a vast horde led by the patriotic Volkhan, with their armies including the titanic Stalin war-mechas and the jungle guerilla Straw Dogs under General Blackblood. Their robots were known to be of better quality than the Western ones (almost all designed by Howard Quartz) and, whereas the Western troops had human officers actively controlling the Warriors, the Volgans allowed Volkhan and Blackblood both autonomy and high rank. They could take direct action, command humans, and in Blackblood's case even carry out interrogation of humans. Volkhan himself was hideously powerful and proclaimed by the robots as "Ikon of Ikons", while he whipped them up in a frenzy to make the "ABC Criminals" "pay... the price for oil!".

As the war went on, the more numerous ABC Warriors overran Volgan forces and by 2084 the northern front was near Lithuania. However, an attempt to take the occupied city of Vilnius by paratroop drop, in order to outflank Volgan forces in Kaliningrad and Belarus, turned into a massacre that the Allies nicknamed "Zarnhem". Later, the US robots pushed into the Republic itself. In one incident, they were forced by human officers to massacre the (fictional) city of Jadrez.

The war officially ended after Marshal Volgod, the then-Volgan leader, was assassinated by the ABC Warrior Steelhorn. Many former Volgan robots would be shipped to Mars as labour, while their commanders were incarcerated.

History within 2000 AD

The Volgans have featured in many 2000 AD stories created by Pat Mills, and he has linked them into the Judge Dredd universe. However they are conspicuously absent from the Judge Dredd stories created by other writers, most notably John Wagner. ABC Warriors: The Volgan War Book 1 has retconned them out of Dredd's universe by showing the war continuing into the 2080s, a decade after the rise of the Judges to power.

Notable Volgans

 Marshal Vashkov – Founder and first Marshal Killed by Savage in 2004
 Colonel Rosa Volgaska – Head of State Security
 Mr. Granville – Head of Disinformation and Psychological warfare against Terrorism
 Field Marshal Zinski – High-ranking Military officer
 Captain Svetlana Jaksic
 Dr Zakaroff

War Droids

 Volkhan – Supreme commander of the Volgan Military
 Old Horny – First War-Droid built
 General Blackblood – Leader of the Straw Dogs

Appearance and real-world parallels
The appearance of the Volgan soldiers is similar to the uniforms and weapons of the Red Army. In 2004 when Savage: Taking Liberties was published, the uniforms and the body armour of the Volgan soldiers began to resemble the combat uniforms of American soldiers (possibly as a reference to the US/Allied invasion and occupation of Iraq in 2003 by the writers of the Savage comic series). Despite the change in the appearance of the uniforms and body armour, the Volgans still used Soviet/Russian weaponry and vehicles like helicopters (e.g. the Mil Mi-24 "Hind" attack helicopters), infantry weapons (e.g. AK-74s, AKSU-74s, AK-103s etc.), and armoured vehicles (with the exception of the American-made Humvee 4WD truck which the Volgans use alongside their Soviet/Russian vehicles) in their brutal occupation of Great Britain and Western Europe.

The British Resistance/Free European Army forces are equipped with NATO small arms like the American-made M16A2 rifle and the German-made Heckler & Koch MP5 submachine gun. The use of NATO and American small arms by the British Resistance and the Free European Army is a sign that the United States and Canada are providing weapons to the resistance fighters in Britain and Europe.

Although often given fascist overtones, the Volgans are given a Soviet theme in The Volgan War, decorating themselves with hammer and sickles and Red stars, most likely a throw back to the Volgans original being the Soviets in the early stages of producing series.

See also

 2000 AD timeline

References

External links
 Smash the Volgs website

2000 AD (comics)
Fictional dictators